Arnsberg is a mountain in the  Bavarian part of the Rhön Mountains, Germany.

Mountains of Bavaria
Mountains and hills of the Rhön